Vinayak Chakravorty (born 25 March) is an Indian film critic, columnist and film journalist based in Delhi-NCR.

He has served as Entertainment Editor at the  Indo-Asian News Service (IANS) news agency. He took up the position after a short stint as a Deputy Editor in First Post Weekly of the Network 18 media conglomerate. Chakravorty was in charge of the cinema and popular arts section during this tenure.

His position at Firstpost was preceded by a decade's association with Mail Today newspaper, when he headed the Entertainment section of the daily. He also reviewed films, apart from writing opinion pieces. His articles, reviews, exclusive interviews and op-eds are regularly featured on the websites of Daily Mail, UK, India Today and dailyo.in, the opinion website of India Today group.

Chakravorty made his mark as a film critic of Delhi's leading newspaper, the Hindustan Times, between 2001 and 2006.

In 2012, 2015 and 2016 he has been a member of the Preview Selection Committee that finalises films for the World Cinema and Panorama sections of the International Film Festival of India (IFFI), held every year in Goa, India.

Early years 
Chakravorty was born in Ranchi, a town formerly in the east Indian state of Bihar and now the capital of the subsequently formed state of Jharkhand. He hails from a middle-class Bengali family, the only child of an engineer father and a school teacher mother.

He studied at St. Xavier's School, Doranda, Ranchi. He further pursued BA(Hons) - English from St. Xavier's College, Ranchi.

He discovered his passion for journalism in high school, when he was inducted into the board of editors of his school magazine, Endeavour.

After graduation, Chakravorty moved to Kolkata for a few years, where he studied journalism at Bharatiya Vidya Bhavan, and topped the post-graduate diploma course at the institution.

Career
Chakravorty admits being torn between the options of pursuing higher studies leading to a career in academics and choosing journalism as his calling. One reason is, despite performing well in journalism school, he enrolled in Kolkata's prestigious Jadavpur University for a Masters course in Comparative Literature. However, a month into his MA course, he received an offer from Kolkata's leading English daily, The Telegraph.

Chakravorty quit his MA course to join The Telegraph as a trainee journalist in October 1995. He started off as a newsdesk sub editor, a job that allowed him to understand the nuances of news sense and newspaper dynamics first hand. During this stint, he also started making his mark as a feature writer, contributing to the op-ed and features pages of the newspaper.

In 1997, he left Kolkata to join The Pioneer newspaper in New Delhi, as a senior feature writer in the daily's Sunday section. A year later, thanks to his passion and knowledge of mainstream and offbeat cinema, Chakravorty was given the chance to review films for the newspaper.

Between 1999 and 2001, Chakravorty briefly romanced the emerging medium of the times, the internet. He joined digitalHT.com, the website hosted by Hindustan Times that was subsequently rechristened as go4i.com. During this phase, he anchored the cinema channel of the website in the capacity of Senior Content Writer, cinema channel. All along, he continued to make his mark as a film critic.

Chakravorty joined Hindustan Times in January 2001 as film critic and feature journalist for a fruitful association of over six years that he ended in July 2007 to join Mail Today, the newspaper launched by the prestigious India Today Group in association with The Daily Mail, UK the same year.

Style of critique 
Chakravorty's film reviews are noted for their precision of opinion and lucid style, combined with bursts of wry humour.

Chakravorty is considered among the select film critics in India whose ratings rarely go wrong. He believes that every film must be reviewed keeping its target audience in mind, which itself does not always translate to box-office success. A critic's star ratings, he adds, should be appreciated and understood in the overall context of his review of a particular film.

As a film critic, Chakravorty cites the iconic Roger Ebert of Chicago Sun-Times as his idol and a major influence.

Personal choices 
Chakravorty's knowledge of world cinema is reflected in his reviews. He labels "just about everything that can be projected on a screen" as cinematic work that might draw his interest, pointing out that good cinema is not genre-specific.

He counts Charles Chaplin, Satyajit Ray, Woody Allen, Steven Spielberg, Krzysztof Kieslowski and the Coen Brothers among favourite filmmakers, besides world cinema by contemporary masters including Lars von Trier, Michael Haneke, Pedro Almodovar, Peter Greenaway and Gaspar Noé.

A supporter of the new-age crossover cinema movement in India, Chakravorty welcomes the advent of new-generation Indian filmmakers such as Anurag Kashyap and Dibakar Banerjee.

References

Indian film critics
Indian male journalists
Living people
People from Ranchi
Year of birth missing (living people)
Jadavpur University alumni